The Torneo Nacional de Clubes is a club rugby union competition in Argentina, organised by the Argentine Rugby Union (UAR). The Nacional de Clubes is the main club competition in Argentine rugby, being contested by a total of 16 teams, 8 from Buenos Aires and 8 from the rest of the provinces of Argentina.

There is also a second division, "Nacional de Clubes B", with a similar format.

History
From 1993 to 2008, the competition involved 16 clubs, which were divided into four zones. The top two clubs of each zone qualified for the quarter-finals of the competition. The 16 best placed clubs in their respective regional championships were eligible to play the Nacional de Clubes. The number of teams were determined were: eight from Buenos Aires, two each from the Noroeste, Litoral and Córdoba and one from both Cuyo and Mar del Plata.

Due to scheduling problems, in 2009 the UAR re-launched the Torneo del Interior, a competition that involved clubs from all provincial unions outside Buenos Aires. The new formula of this tournament coincided with a complete overhaul of the Nacional de Clubes system, so the competition was contested by only 4 teams, 2 from the Torneo del Interior and 2 from URBA.

That format remained until 2013, when the UAR announced that after a three-year hiatus, the Nacional de Clubes would return with the original 16 team format since the 2014 edition, with 9 qualifying from the Torneo del Interior and 7 from the Buenos Aires Union.

Hindú Club is the most winning team with 11 titles.

Format
The "Nacional de Clubes A" is contested by 16 clubs from the best placed teams of the URBA and regional tournaments. Teams are divided into four zones, playing each other in a double round-robin tournament. Teams with the most points in each zone advance to the quarterfinals, concluding with the semi-finals and a final.

List of champions
Below are detailed all the final results:

Notes

Titles by club

References

External links
 

Rugby union competitions in Argentina
Rugby union tournaments for clubs
1993 establishments in Argentina